Baures is a village in Iténez Province, Beni Department, in northern Bolivia. It is the capital of Baures Municipality.

It is served by Baures Airport.

References 

Populated places in Beni Department